Robert Charles Kuziel (born July 24, 1950) is a former American football offensive lineman in the National Football League for the New Orleans Saints and the Washington Redskins.  He also played for the Charlotte Hornets of the World Football League.  Kuziel played college football at the University of Pittsburgh and was drafted in the third round of the 1972 NFL Draft.

Washington Redskin
In 1978, he replaced long-time veteran Len Hauss as the starting center (American football) for the Washington Redskins and played at that position for 3 seasons, up to 1980, his final year, when he started for 13 games. In 1981, he was replaced by Jeff Bostic.

References

1950 births
Living people
Players of American football from New Haven, Connecticut
American football centers
Pittsburgh Panthers football players
New Orleans Saints players
Washington Redskins players
Charlotte Hornets (WFL) players